Alice Barry (born 1942) is an English actress.

Her first regular television role was playing Peggy Hargreaves in Clocking Off. She regularly appeared in Peter Kay's Phoenix Nights and Bob & Rose, and has had minor roles in Linda Green and The Royal.

She has more recently appeared in Shameless as Lillian Tyler, and advertisements for Nutrigrain cake bars. On 9 April 2007, she appeared as a neighbour in Coronation Street. On 3 April 2008, she appeared on The Paul O'Grady Show alongside fellow Shameless star Sean Gilder, who portrayed Paddy Maguire. In October 2013, she reappeared in Coronation Street as Mary Ann Galloway, a fortune teller who made Hayley Cropper's (Julie Hesmondhalgh) dream of visiting the Tower Ballroom, Blackpool come true, even though it was closed for maintenance.

Selected filmography

References

External links

Living people
1946 births
Date of birth missing (living people)
English television actresses